Horse Hollow may refer to:

Horse Hollow (Ripley County, Missouri)
Horse Hollow (Shannon County, Missouri)